Xylodromus depressus is a brown coloured species of beetle in the rove beetle family, that can be found in Albania, Austria, Belgium, Bulgaria, the Czech Republic, France, Germany, Greece, Hungary, Italy, Poland, Portugal, Romania, Russia, Slovakia, Switzerland, the Netherlands, and Ukraine. It can also be found in the Baltic states, Scandinavian countries and all of the republics of former Yugoslavia.

References

External links
Xylodromus depressus on Bug Guide

Beetles described in 1802
Beetles of Europe
Omaliinae
Taxa named by Johann Ludwig Christian Gravenhorst